The Great Indian Family Drama is an Indian stand-up comedy television series, which aired on SAB TV and premiered on 3 January 2015. The series aired. The show was produced by Contiloe Entertainment. The series was inspired from the daily adventures in the life of a Nawaab.

Due to the fall in the TRP rating of the show, the series went off air in less than two months, on 28 February 2015.

Cast

Adaa Khan as Host
Satish Kaushik as Nawaab Jung Bahadur
Archana Puran Singh as Begum Paro
Raaj as Sikandar
Rauf Lala as Shefu, the nosy neighbour
Navneet Nishan as Mohini
Vikalp Mehta as different characters
Shah Faisal Saifi as different characters

References

External links
 

2015 Indian television series debuts
Hindi-language television shows
Sony SAB original programming